Anthony Francis Alfredo (born March 31, 1999) is an American professional stock car racing driver. He competes full-time in the NASCAR Xfinity Series, driving the No. 78 Chevrolet Camaro for B. J. McLeod Motorsports and part-time in the NASCAR Cup Series, driving the No. 78 Chevrolet Camaro ZL1 for Live Fast Motorsports.

Racing career

Early career
After becoming a racing fan after watching on television, Alfredo started his racing career in go-kart racing. After a half-decade hiatus to play other sports, he jumped back in racing in 2014, piloting Legends cars. He later signed a deal with noted short track racer Lee Faulk to run limited late model races with his team, winning the 2016 Southeast Limited Late Model Series Pro Division championship. Alfredo was selected to drive for Dale Earnhardt Jr.'s JR Motorsports (JRM) team in the Late Model division of the CARS Tour in 2017, and finished second in the championship to his teammate, Josh Berry. He continued to race late models stocks in 2018, teaming up with Peyton Sellers.

Alfredo signed with MDM Motorsports to run the entirety of the 2018 NASCAR K&N Pro Series East schedule. He earned his first win at South Boston Speedway in March, He was in position to win late at Langley Speedway in April until Tyler Dippel used a bump-and-run tactic to secure the win. As part of MDM Motorsports, Alfredo entered two ARCA Racing Series events in 2018, scoring a best finish of seventh at Gateway Motorsports Park.

2019–present
On December 6, 2018, it was announced that Alfredo would join the Truck Series in the No. 17 truck for DGR-Crosley in 2019, starting at Atlanta. In his Truck debut, he finished in 17th after qualifying in 27th.

On December 3, 2019, Richard Childress Racing announced Alfredo would drive the No. 21 for the team in the NASCAR Xfinity Series in 2020, sharing the car with Myatt Snider and Kaz Grala. At the Kansas Speedway race in October, Alfredo ran in the top five for much of the day before being involved in a wreck with Justin Allgaier on a late restart that caused his car to hit the wall and flip over; Alfredo was unharmed in the crash. Later in the month at Texas Motor Speedway, he scored a career-best finish of third after battling for the lead but was unable to take the position.

On January 6, 2021, Front Row Motorsports announced that Alfredo would drive the No. 38 car full-time in the NASCAR Cup Series, replacing previous driver John Hunter Nemechek. He finished 30th in the final standings with just one top-ten finish. On November 9, FRM announced that Alfredo would not return to the team in 2022. On December 16, it was announced that Alfredo would drive full-time for Our Motorsports in their No. 23 Chevrolet in the Xfinity Series in 2022. On January 11th, 2023, it was announced that Alfredo would drive the #78 B.J. McLeod Motorsports Chevrolet in the Xfinity Series.

Personal life

Alfredo has experience in the commercial building field. He is also an avid video game player and has set up his own Twitch channel for others to view his gaming.

Motorsports career results

Career summary

NASCAR
(key) (Bold – Pole position awarded by qualifying time. Italics – Pole position earned by points standings or practice time. * – Most laps led.)

Cup Series

Daytona 500

Xfinity Series

Gander Outdoors Truck Series

K&N Pro Series East

ARCA Menards Series
(key) (Bold – Pole position awarded by qualifying time. Italics – Pole position earned by points standings or practice time. * – Most laps led.)

 Season still in progress
 Ineligible for series points

References

External links

 
 

1999 births
Living people
NASCAR drivers
ARCA Menards Series drivers
Racing drivers from Connecticut
Twitch (service) streamers
People from Ridgefield, Connecticut
Richard Childress Racing drivers
JR Motorsports drivers